Partulina is a genus of tropical air-breathing land snails, terrestrial pulmonate gastropod mollusks in the family Achatinellidae.

Species
Species within the genus Partulina include:
 Partulina confusa
†Partulina crassa
 Partulina dolei
 Partulina dubia
 Partulina dwightii
 Partulina fusoidea
 Partulina kaaeana
 Partulina mighelsiana
 †Partulina montagui
 Partulina nattii
 Partulina perdix
 Partulina physa
 Partulina porcellana
 Partulina proxima
 Partulina redfieldi
 Partulina semicarinata
 Partulina splendida -  The splendid partulina
 Partulina talpina
 Partulina tappaniana
 Partulina terebra
 Partulina tessellata
 Partulina ustulata
 Partulina variabilis
 Partulina virgulata

References

Further reading 
 Thacker R. W. & Hadfield M. G. (August 2000) "Mitochondrial Phylogeny of Extant Hawaiian Tree Snails (Achatinellinae)". Molecular Phylogenetics and Evolution 16(2): 263-270. 

 
Achatinellidae
Taxonomy articles created by Polbot